Mary Heaton may refer to:

 Mary Frances Heaton (1801–1878), Englishwoman who was committed to an insane asylum in 1837 for insulting an Anglican vicar and was never released
 Mary Margaret Heaton (1836–1883), English art historian 
 Mary Heaton (gymnast) (1911–1989), British gymnast who competed at the 1936 Summer Olympics

See also
 Mary Eaton (disambiguation)
 Mary Heaton Vorse (1874–1966), American journalist, labor activist, social critic, and novelist